The Periadriatic Seam (or fault) is a distinct geologic fault in Southern Europe, running S-shaped about  from the Tyrrhenian Sea through the whole Southern Alps as far as Hungary. It forms the division between the Adriatic plate and the European plate.

Tectonics and geology

Within the Eastern Alps, the line marks the border between the Central Eastern Alps and the Southern Limestone Alps. In the Western Alps it forms the division between the southern Apulian foreland and the central crystalline zones of the Alps.

Continental collision is still going on, with the Apulian and European plates still converging. The central zones of the Alps are rising too, causing vertical slip along the fault. The result is the set of major fault zones collectively named Periadriatic Seam. Movement along the Periadriatic Seam is the cause for the earthquake zone between Vienna and Friuli. The last destructive earthquake happened in Friuli at the end of the 20th century.

The uplift caused violent erosion of the young orogen, which led to the formation of the Hohe Tauern window. At several regions a heavy uplift of the Central Alps by some kilometers took place, and also a shift of more than 50 km.

Geographic position and names
From east to west, the course of the Periadriatic Seam and the names given to it regionally are as follows:
Drau line: Pannonian Basin – Pohorje – Karawanks – Drau valley (Jauntal, Rosental) – Rosegg
Gailtal line: Villach – Gail valley – Kartitsch
Pustertal line: Sillian – Puster Valley – Bruneck
Giudicárie line: Meran – Val di Sole 
Tonale or Insubric line: Tonale Pass – Val Camonica – Valtellina – Biella.

See also

References

Geology of the Alps
Regional geology
Geology of Austria
Geology of Hungary
Geology of Italy
Geology of Slovenia
Geology of Switzerland
Central Alps
Southern Limestone Alps
Suture zones